Pyrimidine phosphorylase may refer to:
 Thymidine phosphorylase
 Uridine phosphorylase